The 2006–07 Football League Trophy, known as the 2006–07 Johnstone's Paint Trophy for sponsorship reasons, was the 23rd staging of the Football League Trophy, a knockout competition for English football clubs in Leagues One and Two.  The winners were Doncaster Rovers from League One and the runners-up were Bristol Rovers from League Two.

The competition began on 17 October 2006 and ended with the final on 1 April 2007. The final was the last to take place at Millennium Stadium in Cardiff. In the first round, there are four sections: Northern Section–West, Northern Section–East, Southern Section–West and Southern Section–East. In the second round this narrows to simply a Northern and a Southern section, whereupon each section gradually eliminates teams in knock-out fashion until each has a winning finalist. At this point, the two winning finalists face each other in the combined final for the honour of the trophy.

Swansea City were the defending champions, but lost to Peterborough United in the second round.

Doncaster Rovers won the final, beating Bristol Rovers 3–2 after extra time, having been 2–0 up after just 5 minutes before Bristol Rovers scored twice in the second half to make the score 2–2 after 90 minutes.

First round 
Sixteen teams received byes to the second round. The other remaining teams start in a single-legged knockout. Should the scores be level after 90 minutes, the match entered a penalty shootout phase, with no extra-time being played.

Northern Section 

Byes: Blackpool, Chester City, Chesterfield, Crewe Alexandra, Darlington, Mansfield Town, Oldham Athletic, and Port Vale.

Southern Section

Byes: Bournemouth, Bristol City, Cheltenham Town, Leyton Orient, Millwall, Milton Keynes Dons, Peterborough United, Yeovil Town.

Second round
In the second round, the sixteen winning teams from the first round were joined by the teams with byes. Again, there were eight one-legged matches in each section (North and South), with a penalty shootout if a draw occurred after 90 minutes.

Northern Section

Southern Section

Area quarter-finals
In the third round, the winning teams from the second round play in eight one-legged matches, four in each section (North and South). Again, a penalty shootout followed if the match was drawn after 90 minutes. Matches were played on 28 November and 29 November 2006.

Northern Section

Southern Section

Area semi-finals
Matches were played on 8 January 2007.

Northern Section

Southern Section

Area finals

Northern Area final

Doncaster Rovers won 6–5 on aggregate and progressed to the final.

Southern Area final
The Southern Area final produced the first Bristol derby played in over five years.

Bristol Rovers won 1–0 on aggregate and progressed to the final.

Final
The 2007 final was the last major Football Association or Football League final to be held at the Millennium Stadium in Cardiff. All subsequent finals were held at Wembley Stadium in London.

References

Sources

EFL Trophy
Trophy
Trophy